Byung-hee is a Korean unisex given name. Its meaning depends on the hanja used to write each syllable of the name. There are 17 hanja with the reading "byung" and 24 hanja with the reading "hee" on the South Korean government's official list of hanja which may be used in given names.

People with this name include:
Son Byong-hi (1861–1922), Korean male independence activist
Hong Byung-hee (born 1971), South Korean male chemistry researcher
Yun Byeong-hui (born 1976), South Korean female rhythmic gymnast
Kim Byung-Hee (born 1982), South Korean female sport shooter 
G.O (singer) (born Jung Byung-hee, 1987), South Korean male singer, main vocalist of MBLAQ

Fictional characters with this name include:
Go Byung-hee, in 2006 South Korean television series What's Up Fox
Joo Byung-hee, in 2012 South Korean television series Shut Up Flower Boy Band
Kim Byung-hee, in 2020 South Korean television series Nobody Knows

See also
List of Korean given names

References

Korean unisex given names